Elachista argentosa is a moth of the family Elachistidae. It is found in the United States, where it has been recorded from Ohio and Maine.

The wingspan is 7–8 mm. The forewings are almost black with faint golden brown reflections. The markings are metallic silvery, with golden and bluish reflections. The base of the wing is silvery. The hind wings are grayish brown, becoming bluish along the costa near the base. Adults have been recorded on wing from May to August.

The larvae feed on Carex species. They mine the leaves of their host plant. The mine extends downward from the tip of the leaf. Larvae may leave their mine and start a new one. Some silk is spun over the entrance of the old mine. The larvae have a pale yellowish white body and a pale brown head. Mining larvae can be found in April and early May.

References

argentosa
Moths described in 1920
Moths of North America